El Bagawat, is an ancient Christian cemetery, one of the oldest in the world, which functioned at the Kharga Oasis in southern-central Egypt from the 3rd to the 7th century AD. It is one of the earliest and best preserved Christian cemeteries from the ancient world.

Location
The Necropolis of El Bagawat is located in the Western Desert in Kharga Oasis. This is one of the largest oases in Egypt and is 34 m below sea level.

History
The El Bagawat cemetery is reported to be pre-historic and is one of the oldest Christian cemeteries in Egypt. Before Christianity was introduced into Egypt, it was a burial ground used by the non-Christians and later by the Christians. The chapels here are said to belong to both the eras. Coptic frescoes of the 3rd to the 7th century are found on the walls. There are 263 funerary chapels, of which the Chapel of the Exodus (first half of the 4th century) and Chapel of Peace (5th or 6th century) have the best-preserved frescoes, although fresco fragments can also be seen in Chapels 25, 172, 173, 175, and 210.

Features
The El Bagawat cemetery has a very large number of tombs in the form of chapel domes. They are built of mud bricks. The tombs have etchings of biblical stories,
and also of saints and “personifications of virtues”.

In the Exodus Chapel, there is a depiction of the martyrdom of Isiah; and also of Tekla postured with raised hands, in front of fire being doused by rain. In the Chapel of Peace, the illustrative fresco is of Thekla and Paul.

There are paintings in the cemetery which show the ark of Noah in the form of an "Egyptian barque". Also notable are carved representations of Old Testament scriptures, including Adam and Eve, Daniel in the lion's den, the sacrifice of Abraham, and Jonah swallowed by a fish.

References

Bibliography
 
 
 
 
 

3rd-century establishments in Egypt
Christian cemeteries
Cemeteries in Egypt
Coptic settlements
Western Desert (Egypt)